Nicole Kramer (born February 8, 1962) is an American former competition swimmer who represented the United States as a 14-year-old at the 1976 Summer Olympics in Montreal, Quebec.  Kramer finished fifth in the event final of the women's 800-meter freestyle with a time of 8:47.33.  She is the youngest swimmer (14 years, 167 days) to compete for the United States in a Summer Olympics since 1976.

References

1962 births
Living people
American female freestyle swimmers
Olympic swimmers of the United States
Sportspeople from Quincy, Illinois
Swimmers at the 1976 Summer Olympics
21st-century American women